Les Nouillers is a commune in the Charente-Maritime department in the Nouvelle-Aquitaine region in southwestern France.

Geography
The river Boutonne forms all of the commune's northern border.

Population

Sights
The Chateau of Nouillers built in the 16th century

See also
Communes of the Charente-Maritime department

References

External links

 Nouillers Les Nouillers on the Quid site

Communes of Charente-Maritime
Charente-Maritime communes articles needing translation from French Wikipedia